Lost lands are islands or continents believed by some to have existed during pre-history, but to have since disappeared as a result of catastrophic geological phenomena. 

Legends of lost lands often originated as scholarly or scientific theories, only to be picked up by writers and individuals outside the academy. Occult and New Age writers have made use of Lost Lands, as have subaltern peoples such as the Tamils in India. Phantom islands, as opposed to lost lands, are land masses formerly believed by cartographers to exist in the current historical age, but to have been discredited as a result of expanding geographic knowledge. The classification of lost lands as continents, islands, or other regions is in some cases subjective; for example, Atlantis is variously described as either a "lost island" or a "lost continent". Lost land theories may originate in mythology or philosophy, or in scholarly or scientific theories, such as catastrophic theories of geology.

With the development of plate tectonic simulation software, new lost land has been discovered and confirmed by the scientific community (like Greater Adria in 2019).

Submerged lands

Although the existence of lost continents in the above sense is mythical (aside from  Zealandia and Greater Adria), there were many places on Earth that were once dry land, but submerged after the ice age around 10,000 BCE due to rising sea levels, and possibly were the basis for Neolithic and Bronze Age flood myths. Some were lost due to coastal erosion or volcanic eruptions. An (incomplete) list follows:

 Sundaland, the now submerged Sunda Shelf.
 Beringia, connecting Asia and North America.
 Doggerland, the bed of the North Sea, which once connected Great Britain to Continental Europe before being inundated by rising sea levels during the Holocene.
 A large island in the Mediterranean Sea, of which Malta is the only part not now submerged.
 Maui Nui, once a large island of the Hawaii archipelago; several major islands represent residual high ground of Maui Nui.
 New Moore Island, an island in the Bay of Bengal which emerged after a cyclone in 1970 and submerged in 2010.
 Strand, an island off the German coast with the town Rungholt, eroded away by storm surges before being washed away by a final flood in 1634.
 Jordsand, once an island off the Danish coast, eroded away by storm surges before being washed away by a final flood between 1998 and 1999.
 Ferdinandea, submerged volcanic island which has appeared at least four times in the past.
 Ravenser Odd, a large 13th-century town on an old sandbank promontory in East Yorkshire, which became an island and then vanished in January 1392.
 Dadu Island, which was legally the southernmost point of the United States of America, located at Palmyra Atoll (an incorporated U.S. territory) and still shown on the map, was a bare sand islet washed away by a storm in 2014.  (It was named after a dog, "Dadu", that had lived at the atoll.)
 Semyonovsky Island, an island that was discovered in 1770, it had rapidly decreased in size,  to 1823,  in 1936, by the 1950s it was just baydzharakh and when visited in the early 1960s it had been submerged due to erosion.
Balkanatolia, a sunken land in the Mediterranean Sea.

Lost continents

 Greater Adria, a continent connecting between Italy and North Africa.
 Zealandia, a scientifically accepted continent that is now 94% submerged under the Pacific Ocean, surrounding the areas of New Zealand and New Caledonia.

Mythological lands

Agartha, in the Hollow Earth.
Atlantis, Plato's utopian paradise.
Avalon, the mythical lost land or island in Arthurian, Cornish and Welsh legend.
Buyan, an island with the ability to appear and disappear in Slavic mythology.
Cantre'r Gwaelod, in Welsh legend, the ancient sunken realm said to have occupied a tract of fertile land lying between Ramsey Island and Bardsey Island in what is now Cardigan Bay to the west of Wales.
Iram of the Pillars, a reference to a lost city, country or area mentioned in the Qur'an.
 Jomsborg and Vineta, legendary cities on the south coast of the Baltic Sea supposed to have been submerged in the Middle Ages.
Kitezh, a legendary underwater city located in Russia, populated by spiritual people.
Kumari Kandam, a mythical lost continent with an ancient Tamil civilization in the Indian Ocean
Lemuria, a mythical lost continent in the Indian or the Pacific Ocean.
Llys Helig Welsh legends regarding the local rock formations conceal the palace of Prince Helig ap Glanawg, said to be part of a larger drowned kingdom near Penmaenmawr, Wales.
Lyonesse in Arthurian literature: it was the home of Tristan and is usually associated with the Isles of Scilly, Cornwall (an area inundated by the sea c.2500BC). The tale parallels the Welsh and particularly Breton legendary lost lands. 
Mu, a mythical lost continent in the Pacific Ocean
Shangri-La, a fictitious valley in Tibet the idea of which may have been inspired by the myth of Shambhala
Quivira and Cibola, also known as the Seven Cities of Gold. These were suspected somewhere in America by the Conquistadors.
El Dorado, mythic city of gold.
Ys, a mythical drowned city in Brittany, similar to other Celtic lost lands in Welsh and Cornish tradition. Most versions of the legend place the city in the Baie de Douarnenez.

Phantom islands

Phantom islands, as opposed to lost lands, are land masses formerly believed by cartographers to exist in the historical age, but to have been discredited as a result of expanding geographic knowledge. Terra Australis is a phantom continent. While a few phantom islands originated from literary works (e.g., Ogygia from Homer's Odyssey), most phantom islands are the result of navigational errors.

In literature and philosophy
The following individuals are known for having written on the subject of lost lands (either as fiction, hypothesis, or supposed fact):
H.P. Blavatsky
Edgar Rice Burroughs (The Land That Time Forgot, Tarzan and the Jewels of Opar, At the Earth's Core)
James Churchward
Henry Corbin (Malakut or Hurqalya)
Ignatius L. Donnelly
Burak Eldem
Warren Ellis
Philip José Farmer
H. Rider Haggard
Robert E. Howard (Hyborian Age)
Édouard Lalo (Le roi d'Ys)
H. P. Lovecraft often invoked the names of lost lands of his own invention, a practice that subsequently gave birth to the Cthulhu mythos.
Geoffrey of Monmouth first mention of Avalon in his Historia Regum Britanniae
Plato
Augustus Le Plongeon
Zecharia Sitchin
J. R. R. Tolkien partially based the story of Númenor, referenced in The Lord of the Rings and The Silmarillion, on Atlantis.
Jack Vance (Lyonesse Trilogy)
Samael Aun Weor
Umberto Eco (Island of the Day Before)

See also
Flood myth
Lost city
Lost world
Vanishing island
Tidal island

References

Further reading
L. Sprague de Camp and Willy Ley, Lands Beyond, Rinehart & Co., New York, 1952.
L. Sprague de Camp, Lost Continents: The Atlantis Theme in History, Science, and Literature, Dover Publications, 1970.

Geography-related lists
Lost ancient cities and towns
Ancient astronomy
Historical geology
Plate tectonics